Zehra Güneş (born 7 July 1999) is a Turkish volleyball player. Currently, she plays for Vakıfbank Istanbul and is a member of the Turkey women's national volleyball team.

Playing career

Club 
In the 2016–17 Turkish Women's Volleyball League season, Güneş was loaned out to Beşiktaş J.K., another women's volleyball team. The next season, she returned to her home club. She enjoyed her first league champion title in the 2017–18 season with Vakıfbank Istanbul. She was awarded the "Vestel Special Prize" of the 2017–18 Vestel Venus Sultans League, which is the Turkish top-level volleyball league sponsored by Vestel.

She participated at the 2017–18 CEV Women's Champions League with her team Vakıfbank Istanbul, which became champion.

International 
Güneş played at the  2015 European Youth Summer Olympic Festival held in Georgia. She took part at the 2015 FIVB Volleyball Girls' U18 World Championship in Peru, and was awarded the Best Middle Blocker title. Güneş played at the 2016 FIVB World Grand Prix. She was a member of the Turkey women's U20 team, and took part at the 2017 FIVB Volleyball Women's U20 World Championship in Mexico, where she was named one of the Best Middle Blockers. She played for the Turkey women's U23 team at the 2017 FIVB Volleyball Women's U23 World Championship in Slovenia, where her team won a champion title.

In January 2017, she was invited to the Turkey women's team, and was admitted to the team in March 2018. She played at the very first 2018 FIVB Volleyball Women's Nations League as part of the Turkish team, which won silver. She was also part of the Turkish squad at the 2020 Tokyo Summer Olympics, which finished in fifth place.

Honours 

 VakıfBank S.K.
2017 Turkish Women's Volleyball Super Cup
2017 FIVB Club World Championship –  Gold Medal
2018 Turkish Women's Volleyball Cup –  Gold Cup
2017–18 Turkish Women's Volleyball League –  Gold Medal
2017–18 CEV Women's Champions League –  Gold Medal
2018 FIVB Club World Championship –  Gold Medal
2019 FIVB Club World Championship –  Bronze Medal
2020 Turkish Super Cup –  Silver Cup
2020–21 CEV Women's Champions League –  Silver Medal
2021 FIVB Club World Championship –  Gold Medal
 2021–22 CEV Women's Champions League –  Gold Medal
 2022 FIVB Volleyball Women's Club World Championship -   Silver Medal

National team
 2017 U23 World Championship –   Gold Medal
 2018 Nations League –   Silver Medal
 2019 European Championship –  Silver Medal
 2021 Nations League –  Bronze Medal
 2021 European Championship –  Bronze Medal

Individual 
Most Valuable Player:
2021–22 Turkish Women's Volleyball League 

Best Middle Blocker:
2015 FIVB Volleyball Girls' U18 World Championship
2017 FIVB Volleyball Women's U20 World Championship
2019 FIVB Women's Club World Championship
2021 FIVB Women's Club World Championship
2022 FIVB Volleyball Women's Club World Championship

Vestel Special Prize: 
2017–18 Vestel Venus Sultans League

References 

Living people
1999 births
People from Kartal
Volleyball players from Istanbul
Turkish women's volleyball players
VakıfBank S.K. volleyballers
Beşiktaş volleyballers
Turkey women's international volleyball players
Volleyball players at the 2020 Summer Olympics
Olympic volleyball players of Turkey
21st-century Turkish women